Basil of Ani or Basil Pahlavuni (died 13 November 1113 AD) was Armenian Catholicos of Cilicia from 1105 to 1113, and nephew of Gregory II. 

Catholicos Gregory II had moved to Tarsus, far from the center of Armenian civilization for the past many centuries, so the eastern Armenians considered themselves without a pontiff. Gregory had previously visited Ani and set up his nephew Parsegh as bishop there, and so later they gained Gregory's sanction to elect Parsegh their pontiff. Around this time two other rivals named themselves pontiff of their own regions: Theodorus and one named Paul in Marash. There was much enmity between them and much confusion among the people. Paul saw this and decided to relinquish his seat and retire to his convent, at which time the nation at large recognized Gregory II alone as pontiff, with Parsegh as his deputy. In 1087 Parsegh deposed Theodorus and settled at Edessa. 

In 1103, after many requests, Gregory II finally accepted the invitation of 
Basilius the Crafty, lord of Marash and Kesoun, to move his residence to Rapan, near Kesoun, to spend his last years. Gregory II took with him his wards Gregory III of Cilicia and Nerses IV the Graceful, in whom he recognized future greatness. He entrusted the two boys to the care of his nephew and deputy Parsegh and his host Basilius, and stated that on his death Parsegh should be made Catholicos to be followed by Gregory.

Parsegh succeeded Gregory II two years later, in 1105. Parsegh had his seat sometimes in the Red Convent in the desert of Shughr and sometimes in the city of Edessa. He saw to the education of Gregory and Nerses, and soon ordained Gregory a priest.

During this period the Persians invaded Cilicia but were defeated by the forces of Basilius. Two years later though Cilicia was once again invaded, this time by Scythians. In 1111, they attacked the fortress of Zovk, held by Gregory and Nerses's father Apirat Pahlavi, grandson of Gregorius Magistratus, who was killed.

Parsegh died in the Red Convent after being pontiff for thirty-one years, eight of those as sole ruler of the Armenian Church. Based on Gregory II's wishes, Gregory the son of Apirat was elected Catholicos at the Red Convent, only twenty years old.

Catholicoi of Armenia
Catholicoi of Cilicia
Armenian Oriental Orthodox Christians
1113 deaths
Year of birth unknown
12th-century Oriental Orthodox archbishops